The Donostia Award is an honorary award created in 1986 which is given every year to a number of actors and film directors in the San Sebastián International Film Festival. It derives its name from Donostia, the Basque name of San Sebastián.

Recipients

See also 

 Golden Shell for Best Film
 Silver Shell for Best Director
 Silver Shell for Best Actress
 Sebastiane Award

References

External links
Official Site Archive

San Sebastián International Film Festival
Lifetime achievement awards